Grup may refer to:

 Grup Gerak Khas, a special forces regiment of the Malaysian Army
 ADD Grup, a developer and manufacturer of smart metering solutions
 Transferoviar Grup, a private railway company in Romania
 Grup, a term for grown-ups Star Trek episode "Miri"

See also 
 Group (disambiguation)
 Grupp, a surname